Forfar was a royal burgh that returned one commissioner to the Parliament of Scotland and to the Convention of Estates.

After the Acts of Union 1707, Forfar, Cupar, Dundee, Perth and St Andrews formed the Perth district of burghs (sometimes called Forfar Burghs), returning one member between them to the House of Commons of Great Britain.

List of burgh commissioners

 1661: David Dickinson, bailie 
1665 convention, 1667 convention: not represented
 1669–74: James Carnegie
 1678 convention, 1681–82, 1685–86, 1689 convention, 1689–95: John Carnegie, bailie and provost (died c.1695)
 1698–1701, 1702–07: John Lyon, sheriff clerk

References

See also
 List of constituencies in the Parliament of Scotland at the time of the Union

Constituencies of the Parliament of Scotland (to 1707)
Politics of the county of Forfar
History of Angus, Scotland
Constituencies disestablished in 1707
1707 disestablishments in Scotland